The Night Has Eyes, released in the United States as Terror House by Producers Releasing Corporation and re-released in the US by Cosmopolitan Pictures in 1949 as Moonlight Madness, is a 1942 British thriller film directed by Leslie Arliss starring James Mason, Joyce Howard, Wilfrid Lawson, Mary Clare. and Tucker McGuire. It is based on the 1939 novel of the same title by Alan Kennington.

Plot
Two young teachers travel to the Yorkshire Moors where their friend disappeared a year before. Before long they have encountered the man they believe to be her murderer. That night, they become stranded in the house where they are staying when a violent storm breaks out.

Cast
 James Mason as Stephen Deremid
 Wilfrid Lawson as Jim Sturrock
 Joyce Howard as Marian Ives
 Mary Clare as Mrs. Ranger
 Tucker McGuire as Doris
 John Fernald as Doctor Barry Randall
 Dorothy Black as Miss Fenwick
 Amy Dalby as Miss Miggs

Critical reception
Leonard Maltin called the film an "OK mystery"; Allmovie called it a "taut British chiller" ; and TV Guide wrote "though melodramatic and soundstage-bound, Terror House is still quite effective and eerie. Fog covers almost every exterior; cinematographer Gunther Krampf spent long periods getting the artificial fog at just the right density...The final film was almost too effective, and after initially getting an A rating from the British censor and being booked on the biggest cinema circuit in Britain, the rating was suddenly changed to H (for "Horrific"), making it off-limits for anyone under 16 years of age. The big circuits had a policy of showing only A films, so the independent cinemas became the big winners, getting an excellent thriller starring Mason, Britain's top leading man at the time."

References

External links
 

1942 films
1940s thriller films
Films directed by Leslie Arliss
Films set in Yorkshire
Compositions by Charles Williams
British black-and-white films
British thriller films
Producers Releasing Corporation films
1940s English-language films
1940s British films